The 2930s is a band from Berlin which started in 2009 by Guss Brooks of The BossHoss and Australian musician The Josh. Originally a studio only project, after a few months of writing and recording, the band decided to perform live shows. Wanting to perform in a style and musical direction different from their other projects, The 2930s perform a mix of roots based garage rock and roll, with a touch of indie pop.

Band history 

The band was formed in 2009 in Berlin by Guss Brooks and The Josh when there was a break in The BossHoss touring schedule. The band started with the concept of a studio/recording project, with The Stig performing the drums. As all 3 members were performing already in bands with either county, blues, rockabilly or classic rock and roll music direction, the band decided to write songs in a heavier, punk, garage or indie direction.

The original rehearsals and song writing took place in Dresden, Germany in late 2009 and the band quickly had enough material to perform live, and decided that as well as recording, they would perform live, in between the schedules of their other projects. Their first recording sessions begun in November 2009 at Sonnenstudio, Berlin. Their first live show was at Rosis Amüsierlokal in Dresden on the 29 and 30 December 2009.

In March 2010 The 2930s performed support for The BossHoss at the Alte Schlachthof in Dresden.

In June 2010 The 2930s finished their first release. A limited edition self-release E.P. "The Ride", with 6 original songs all recorded at Sonnenstudio/Internashville Recordings in Berlin.

With the success of The BossHoss, Guss Brooks schedule was again quiet full, and so recording and song writing time was very limited. However, eventually in 2014 the band could release their first full-length CD "Reaching The Highs / Touching The Lows".

After the release of "Reaching The Highs / Touching The Lows" The Josh built his own studio in Dresden "Catalina Music" and continued to write and record for their 3rd release.

With the help of their close connection to Alec "Boss“ Völkel, Sascha "Hoss“ Vollmer, The 2930s released their 2nd CD "Tell Me I'm Crazy" on The BossHoss new record label "Internashville Recordings"  and performed support shows with The BossHoss during their Dos Bros Tour in April 2016.

In late 2017, The 2930s released "Drive", again on The BossHoss label Internashville Recordings.

Discography

Studio albums 
2010 - The Ride E.P.
2014 - Reaching The Highs / Touching The Lows
2016 - Tell Me I'm Crazy (Internashville Recordings) 
2017 - Drive

References

External links 

Official homepage
Internashville Recordings

Musical groups from Berlin